The following is a list of notable film schools that are active, grouped by country.

Around the world, there are both public and private institutions dedicated to teaching film either as a department within a larger university, or as a stand-alone entity. There is also a distinction between film programs in existing private colleges and art schools, and purely for-profit institutions. The popularity of film and television production courses has exponentially increased since the 1980s and there are now more than 1,200 known institutions offering such courses around the world.

Africa

Asia/Pacific

Pakistan 

 University of Lahore (School of Creative Arts) Lahore
 Shaheed Zulfikar Ali Bhutto Institute of Science and Technology, Karachi
 University of Karachi (Department of Visual Studies), Karachi
 Iqra University, Karachi
 National College of Arts, Lahore
 Beaconhouse National University, Lahore
 Punjab University, Lahore

Middle East
Israel

 Tel Aviv University Department of Film and Television, Tel Aviv
 Bezalel Academy of Arts and Design, Jerusalem
 Sam Spiegel Film and Television School, Jerusalem
 Sapir Academic College, Sderot

Jordan

 Yarmouk University
 Amman Filmmakers Cooperative
 Red Sea Institute of Cinematic Arts

Lebanon

 Holy Spirit University of Kaslik
 Lebanese Academy of Fine Arts
 Lebanese American University
 Notre Dame University – Louaize

United Arab Emirates

 The College of Architecture, Art & Design at the American University of Sharjah

Oceania

Europe

Turkey

 Istanbul Bilgi University
 Istanbul Kültür University (IKU), CILECT Member.
 Istanbul University (Faculty of Communication, Radio, TV and Cinema).
 Izmir University of Economics (Faculty of Communication, Department of Cinema and Digital Media)
 Mimar Sinan Fine Arts University
 Yaşar University Film Design.

United Kingdom 
The following film schools are internationally accredited by the International Association of Film and Television Schools, or CILECT.

 Bournemouth Film School, Arts University Bournemouth
 Falmouth University,
 University of Hertfordshire
 London Film School
 Met Film School
 National Film and Television School
 Film & TV School Wales, University of South Wales
 Northern Film School at Leeds Beckett University
 Screen Academy Scotland, Napier University
 University for the Creative Arts at Farnham
 Westminster Film School, University of Westminster

Other schools (which may accredited by Creative Skillset):

 University of Bristol, Department of Drama
 University of Gloucestershire
 Goldsmiths, University of London
 Kingston University, London
 Skillset Screen Academy at LCC, University of the Arts London
 London Film Academy
 Manchester School of Art, Manchester Metropolitan University
 Middlesex University, Hendon, London
 Richmond University, London
 Ravensbourne College of Design & Communication

North America

United States

South America

See also

 List of film institutes
 Film school

References